David D. Sharpe (born August 21, 1946) is an American Democratic politician. Since January 2003 he serves as member of the Vermont House of Representatives from Addison-4 district.

References

1946 births
Living people
Politicians from Detroit
Democratic Party members of the Vermont House of Representatives
University of Vermont alumni
21st-century American politicians